Haroon Sharif (born 20 February 1965) is a Pakistani economist who served as the Minister of State and Chairman Board of Investment under Prime Minister Imran Khan from September 2018 to June 2019.

Prior to this, Sharif served as the Regional Advisor to the World Bank Group for South Asia and remained Senior Regional Advisor to the UK's Department for International Development (DFID).

Early life and education
Sharif earned a BA in Economics and Geography from the Government College University, Lahore in 1985. He completed his postgraduate Curriculum in International Business in 1991 from the University of Hawaii at Manoa and MSc in Development Management from the London School of Economics and Political Science in 2000.

Professional career
On behalf of the Government of Pakistan, Sharif signed the Memorandum of Understanding with China for Industrial Cooperation under the China-Pakistan Economic Corridor. He remained the lead person for Pakistan for the establishment and regulation of Special Economic Zones (SEZs).

Sharif was a member of Economic Coordination Committee of the Cabinet which is the highest forum for economic policy decisions in Pakistan. He was instrumental in developing strategic economic partnerships with Malaysia, Saudi Arabia and Qatar.

Board and professional memberships
Sharif served on the Executive Committee of the World Bank's Consultative Group to Assist the Poor (CGAP) from 2009-2012. He was part of the team that authored CGAP's report Financial Access to the World's Poor.

Sharif is also a distinguished fellow of the National Defence University, Pakistan.

Publications

References 

Pakistani expatriates in the United States
Alumni of the London School of Economics
Government College University, Lahore alumni
University of Hawaiʻi at Mānoa alumni
20th-century Pakistani economists
1965 births
Living people
Pakistani expatriates in the United Kingdom
21st-century Pakistani economists